The 10th Artistic Gymnastics World Championships were held in Budapest, Hungary, in conjunction with the 50th anniversary of the founding of the Hungarian Gymnastics Federation, on June 1–2, 1934.

It was the first World Championships with a women's segment to the competition.

Medals

Men

Team final

All-around

Apparatus

Floor exercise

Pommel horse

Rings

Vault

Parallel bars

Horizontal bar 

 A few discrepancies exist in data for the results from these World Championships.

Women 

This first ever women's competition at a World Artistic Gymnastics Championships consisted of a competitive field including five countries and 40 individual competitors.

Team final

All-around

References

World Artistic Gymnastics Championships
World Artistic Gymnastics Championships, 1934
Gym
International gymnastics competitions hosted by Hungary